Ivanovci is a dispersed village in the Municipality of Moravske Toplice in the Prekmurje region of Slovenia.

The writer and politician József Borovnyák, the writer and politician Ferenc Ivanóczy, the writer Sándor Terplán, and the poet Ágost Péter Lutharics were all born in Ivanovci. The writer István Szelmár also lived in the village.

References

External links 

Ivanovci on Geopedia

Populated places in the Municipality of Moravske Toplice